Jenny Klinge (born 28 November 1975) is a Norwegian politician for the Centre Party.

She served as a deputy representative to the Norwegian Parliament from Møre og Romsdal during the term 2005–2009. She was elected to a full term for the 2009–2013 term. She sits on the Standing Committee on Justice.

On the local level, she is a former deputy mayor of Surnadal.

In 2012 she stated that male circumcision for religious reasons should be prohibited in the same way that female genital mutilation is.

References

1975 births
Living people
Deputy members of the Storting
Centre Party (Norway) politicians
Møre og Romsdal politicians
21st-century Norwegian politicians